Serge Letchimy (born 13 January 1953) is the President of the Executive Council of Martinique and former member of the National Assembly of France. He represents the island of Martinique's 3rd constituency since June 2007, and is a member of The Socialists and affiliated parliamentary group. Letchimy is a member of the Martinican Progressive Party (PPM), or Parti progressiste martiniquais. He was the successor of Aimé Césaire as Mayor of Fort de France from 2001 to 2010 and was the final President of the Regional Council of Martinique from 26 March 2010 until its replacement by the Assembly of Martinique in December 2015.

In 2021 he replaced Alfred Marie-Jeanne as President of the Executive Council of Martinique, and therefore resigned from parliament due to the dual mandate.

References

External links 

 le site officiel de serge letchimy
 Le site Internet officiel du PPM
 « L'alchimie Letchimy » Dossier de L'Express, 11 novembre 2004
  page on the French National Assembly website

1953 births
Black French politicians
Living people
Presidents of the Regional Council of Martinique
Mayors of places in Martinique
Martinican Progressive Party politicians
Martiniquais politicians
French people of Martiniquais descent
Martiniquais people of Indian descent
Deputies of the 13th National Assembly of the French Fifth Republic
Deputies of the 14th National Assembly of the French Fifth Republic
Deputies of the 15th National Assembly of the French Fifth Republic